Brayson is a surname. Notable people with the surname include:

Paul Brayson (born 1977), English footballer
Óscar Brayson (born 1985), Cuban judoka

See also
Branson (surname)
Bryson (surname)